Ilioupoli ( "Sun City") is a suburban municipality belongs to Central Athens regional unit and located in the central-southern part of the Athens. Its name is the modern form of the ancient name of Heliopolis in Egypt. Development of Ilioupoli started around 1924, when Greek refugees from Asia Minor settled there. Ilioupoli is twinned with Novi Sad (Serbia) and Larnaca (Cyprus).

Geography
The municipality has an area of 12.724 km2. It lies at the western foot of the forested Hymettus mountain, which covers the eastern half of the municipality. Its built-up area is continuous with those of neighbouring suburbs Ymittos, Agios Dimitrios, Alimos and Argyroupoli. The main thoroughfares are Vouliagmenis Avenue, which connects Ilioupoli with central Athens, and Venizelou Avenue, which connects with Motorway 64. Ilioupoli station is served by Line 2 of the Athens Metro. Ilioupoli is also linked by bus to downtown Athens (OASA 237 line), to Glyfada (OASA 140 line) and Piraeus (OASA 218 line).

Ilioupoli is subdivided into 11 quarters: Agia Marina, Agia Mavra, Agia Paraskevi, Agios Konstantinos-Kanaria, Ano Ilioupoli, Astynomika-Panorama, Kato Ilioupoli, Kentro, Nisaki, Typografika and Chalikaki. Ilioupoli has an uncommon street plan, characterised by 5 sets of concentric circular or oval streets.

Climate

Ilioupoli has a hot-summer Mediterranean climate (Köppen climate classification: Csa). Ilioupoli experiences hot, dry summers and mild, wetter winters.

Current Weather (2021)

Weather records for 2021 in Ilioupoli (as of 1 November 2021) are given below:

Historical population

Landmarks
Anapsiktirio "Demetrios Kintis"
Plateia Iroon (Iroon Square)
Koimisi tis Theotokou Church
Kentriki Plateia (Central Square)
The Stouggaris Building (Sophia the fox, big one)
Plateia Kanaria (Kanaria Square)
Plateia Flemingk (Fleming Square)

Sports
Ilioupoli is the seat of the clubs Charavgiakos F.C., club founded in 1949 and Ilioupoli F.C., club founded in 1953.

References
Notes

External links
Official website 
Europe/Greece/Attica/Attiki/Ilioupoli/ Photos of Ilioupoli
http://www.cityofilioupolis.gr/ (in Greek)
Ilioupoli's online shopping guide  

Municipalities of Attica
Populated places in Central Athens (regional unit)